V380 Cygni is an eclipsing binary star in the constellation Cygnus, located about 3,800 light years away from the Earth. Its apparent magnitude ranges from 5.61 to 5.78, making it faintly visible to the naked eye of an observer located far from city lights. Because it is an important test object for models of massive stars, it has been the subject of many scientific studies.

V380 Cygni was discovered to be a spectroscopic binary by Walter Sydney Adams, based on three spectra taken on separate nights in 1912 at the Mount Wilson Observatory. The binary's orbit was first calculated from spectra obtained in 1920 at the DDO; the period was found to be 12.427 days. Because the physical separation of spectroscopic binaries is often relatively small, they are good candidates to be eclipsing binaries. For that reason, in 1923 Joel Stebbins included V380 Cygni (then called Boss 5070) in an early photo-electric photometry study. A secondary eclipse was detected in June 1923 on the first night the star was observed.

V380 Cygni was observed several times at high cadence, for many days, by the Kepler spacecraft. In addition to the brightness variations caused by eclipses, the Kepler data showed that the primary star has significant intrinsic variability which is most apt to be caused by gravity-mode oscillations.

References

Algol variables
Cygnus (constellation)
97634
187879
Durchmusterung objects
Cygni, V380
7567